Sâmbăta is a commune in Bihor County, Crișana, Romania with a population of 1,475  people. It is composed of six villages: Copăceni (Kapocsány), Ogești (Csékehodos), Rogoz (Venterrogoz), Rotărești (Kerekesfalva), Sâmbăta and Zăvoiu (Törpefalva).

References

Communes in Bihor County
Localities in Crișana